Jesús Guerrero Béiztegui (born April 20, 1949) is a former Spanish handball player who competed in the 1972 Summer Olympics.

In 1972 he was part of the Spanish team which finished fifteenth in the Olympic tournament. He played all five matches.

References

1949 births
Living people
Spanish male handball players
Olympic handball players of Spain
Handball players at the 1972 Summer Olympics